Kumaramangalam is a village in the Kumbakonam taluk of Thanjavur district, Tamil Nadu, India.

Demographics 

As per the 2001 census, Kumaramangalam had a total population of 1315 with 676 males and 639 females. The sex ratio was 945. The literacy rate was 72.69%.

References 

 

Villages in Thanjavur district